Georgi Stoychev (born 3 July 1977 in Sevlievo) is a retired Bulgarian football player who played as a midfielder and defender. He has spent his entire playing career with the team from Sevlievo from 1996 to 2015.

References

Living people
1977 births
Bulgarian footballers
Association football midfielders
PFC Vidima-Rakovski Sevlievo players
First Professional Football League (Bulgaria) players
People from Sevlievo